Kazakh Canadians are Canadian citizens of Kazakh descent or persons of Kazakh descent residing in Canada. According to the 2016 Census there were 3,330 Canadians who claimed Kazakh ancestry. An Association of Kazakhs in Canada was established on November 12, 2003, in Toronto, Ontario.

Notable Kazakh Canadians
Nik Antropov, NHL hockey player
Anjelika Reznik, gymnast
Victoria Reznik, gymnast
Sanzhar Sultanov, film director
Ola Volo, artist

See also
Middle Eastern Canadians
West Asian Canadians

References

Ethnic groups in Canada
Asian Canadian
 
Kazakhstani diaspora